Elateriformia is an infraorder of polyphagan beetles.  The two largest families in this group are buprestids, of which there are around 15,000 described species, and click beetles, of which there are around 10,000 described species.

The infraorder consists of six superfamilies:

Buprestoidea — the metallic wood-boring beetles
Byrrhoidea — families including long-toed water beetles, moss beetles and mud-loving beetles
Dascilloidea
Elateroidea — including the click beetles and soldier beetles
Rhinorhipoidea
Scirtoidea

See also
 List of subgroups of the order Coleoptera

References 

 
Insect infraorders